Joe Runions (born November 6, 1940) is an American politician. He is a member of the Missouri House of Representatives, having served since 2013. He is a member of the Democratic Party.

Runions was diagnosed with Coronavirus disease 2019 on March 20, 2020.

References

Living people
Democratic Party members of the Missouri House of Representatives
1940 births
21st-century American politicians